The 2022–23 CAF Champions League (officially the 2022–23 TotalEnergies CAF Champions League for sponsorship purposes) is the 59th season of Africa's premier club football tournament organized by the Confederation of African Football (CAF) and the 27th edition under the current CAF Champions League title.

Unlike the last three seasons, the final of this edition will be played in a two-legged format as per the decision of CAF at the executive committee meeting on July 3 at Rabat, arising from a formal complaint made by Al Ahly to CAF over the choice of Stade Mohammed V in Casablanca as the venue for the 2022 final: despite the intention that the final be played at a neutral venue, the 2022 tournament culminated with the stadium being the home venue of their opponent, Wydad AC.

The winners of the 2022–23 CAF Champions League will automatically qualify for the 2023–24 CAF Champions League and earn the right to play against the winners of the 2022–23 CAF Confederation Cup in the 2023 CAF Super Cup along with the 2023 FIFA Club World Cup in Saudi Arabia.

Wydad AC are the defending champions after beating Al Ahly in the 2022 final to claim their third title and first since 2017.

Association team allocation
All 54 CAF member associations are expected to enter their league champions into this season of the CAF Champions League, with the 12 highest ranked associations according to their CAF 5-Year Ranking eligible to enter two teams in this season. As a result, theoretically a maximum of 68 teams could enter the tournament – although this level has never been reached.

For this season of the tournament, CAF will the use the 2018–2022 CAF 5-Year Ranking, which calculates points for each entrant association based on their clubs’ performance over those 5 years in CAF club competitions. The criteria for points are as follows:

The points are multiplied by a coefficient according to the year as follows:
2021–22: x 5
2020–21: × 4
2019–20: × 3
2018–19: × 2
2018: × 1

Teams
The following 58 teams from 46 associations participated in this edition of the competition.
Teams in bold received a bye to the second round.
The other teams entered the first round.

Associations are shown according to their 2018–2022 CAF 5-Year Ranking – those with a ranking score have their rank and score (in parentheses) indicated.

 Associations which did not enter a team

Notes:

Schedule
The official competition schedule was released on 24 June 2022 on their website to prepare the qualified teams for the upcoming season.

Qualifying rounds

First round

Second round

Group stage

In the group stage, each group is played on a home-and-away round-robin basis. The winners and runners-up of each group will advance to the quarter-finals of the knockout stage.

Group A

Group B

Group C

Group D

Knockout stage

Top goalscorers

See also
2022–23 CAF Confederation Cup
2023 CAF Super Cup

References

External links

2022-23
 
1
1